Albahaca may refer to:

 Ocimum campechianum ("albahaca de monte"), widespread across the Americas from Mexico southward.
 Ocimum basilicum, which is the basil ingredient for cooking, grown worldwide.
 Celosia virgata, a shrub found in Puerto Rico and the Virgin Islands.

References